Tetragonus lycaenoides is a moth of the  family Callidulidae. It is found in Sulawesi, Borneo, Peninsular Malaysia, Sumatra and Nias.

References

Callidulidae
Moths described in 1874